Hassan Turabi is the name of:

Allama Hassan Turabi (1940–2006), Pakistani cleric
Hassan Al-Turabi (1932–2016), Sudanese political leader